László József Bíró (born László József Schweiger; 29 September 1899 – 24 October 1985), Hispanicized as Ladislao José Biro, was a Hungarian-Argentine inventor who patented the first commercially successful modern ballpoint pen. The first ballpoint pen had been invented roughly 50 years earlier by John J. Loud, but it was not a commercial success.

Early life
Bíró was born to a Hungarian Jewish family in Budapest, Kingdom of Hungary, within the Austro-Hungarian Empire, in 1899 to Mózes Mátyás Schweiger and Janka née Ullmann. After leaving school, he began work as a journalist in Hungary.

Invention of the ballpoint pen
While working as a journalist, Bíró noticed that the ink used in newspaper printing dried quickly, leaving the paper dry and smudge-free. He tried using the same ink in a fountain pen, but found that it would not flow into the tip, as it was too viscous.

Bíró presented the first production of the ballpoint pen at the Budapest International Fair in 1931. Working with his brother György, a chemist, he developed a new tip consisting of a ball that was free to turn in a socket, and as it turned it would pick up ink from a cartridge and then roll to deposit it on the paper. Bíró patented the invention in Paris in 1938.

During World War II, Bíró fled the Nazis with his brother, moving to Argentina, in 1943. This new design was supposedly licensed for production in the United Kingdom for supply to Royal Air Force aircrew.

In 1945, Marcel Bich bought the patent from Bíró for the pen, which soon became the main product of his BIC company. Bic has sold more than 100 billion ballpoint pens worldwide. In November of that same year, promoter Milton Reynolds introduced a gravity-fed pen to the U.S. market, to try to get around Biro's patent, which was based on capillary action, where fresh ink is drawn out of the reservoir of the pen as ink is deposited on the paper. Because the Reynolds workaround depended on a gravity feed, it did not infringe, but required thinner ink and a larger barrel. The Reynolds Pen was successful for a few years until its reputation for leaking and competition from established pen manufacturers overtook it.

Death and legacy
László Bíró died in Buenos Aires, Argentina, in 1985.

Argentina's Inventors' Day is celebrated on Bíró's birthday, 29 September.

A ballpoint pen is widely referred to as a "biro" in many countries, including the UK, Ireland, Australia and Italy. Although the word is a registered trademark, in some countries it has become genericised.  On 29 September 2016, the 117th anniversary of his birth, Google commemorated Bíró with a Google Doodle for "his relentless, forward-thinking spirit".

References

External links

Brief biography of Bíró by Budapest Pocket Guide

1899 births
1985 deaths
Argentine inventors
Argentine Jews
Argentine people of Hungarian-Jewish descent
Hungarian emigrants to Argentina
Hungarian inventors
Hungarian Jews
Hungarian journalists
Naturalized citizens of Argentina
People from Buda
Pens
20th-century journalists